Henry John FitzRoy Somerset, 12th Duke of Beaufort (born 22 May 1952), styled Marquess of Worcester between 1984 and 2017, also known as Harry Beaufort or Bunter Beaufort, previously as Bunter Worcester, is an English peer and landowner, with estates in Gloucestershire and Wiltshire based on Badminton House.

Biography
Beaufort is the son of the 11th Duke of Beaufort and his wife, Lady Caroline Jane Thynne (1928–1995), a daughter of the 6th Marquess of Bath. He and his family are descended in the male line from the House of Plantagenet, through an illegitimate line.

Beaufort was educated at Hawtreys, Eton College, and the Royal Agricultural College.

He is a singer and songwriter with the rock group The Listening Device. This was a support act at the Highclere Rocks concert in 2006, which also featured Bryan Ferry, Eric Clapton, and Roger Waters.

Since the death of his father, Beaufort is also master of the Duke of Beaufort's Hunt.

Personal life
His first wife was the environmentalist and former actress Tracy Louise Ward (a sister of Rachel Ward and a granddaughter of William Ward, 3rd Earl of Dudley). They were married on 13 June 1987 at Cornwell, in Oxfordshire, but later separated, and were divorced in 2018. The marriage produced three children:

 Henry Robert FitzRoy Somerset, Marquess of Worcester, formerly known as Earl of Glamorgan (b. 20 January 1989); married Lucy Eleanor Yorke-Long (b. 23 June 1986), in August 2020. They have one son: Henry, Earl of Glamorgan (b. 28 May 2021)
 Lady Isabella Elsa Somerset (b. 3 August 1992)
 Lord Alexander Lorne Somerset (b. 19 November 1993)

On 30 April 2018, Beaufort married secondly Georgia Powell (born 18 February 1969), a granddaughter of the novelist Anthony Powell.

Arms

Notes

External links 
 The Listening Device Official Website

1952 births
Living people
Masters of foxhounds in England
People educated at Eton College
English socialites
People educated at Hawtreys
Henry John Fitzroy
111